Simone Potop (born 15 January 2000) is an Italian professional footballer who plays as a centre back for  club Fiorenzuola.

Club career

Fiorenzuola
Simone made his senior debut for Fiorenzuola on 15 November 2020, in a 1–0 away victory over Seravezza Pozzi Calcio counting for the Serie D.

He made his Serie C debut  on 28 August 2021 in a game against FeralpiSalò.

Career statistics

Club

References

External links
 

2000 births
Living people
Italian people of Romanian descent
Footballers from Turin
Italian footballers
Association football defenders
Serie C players
Serie D players
Torino F.C. players
A.C. Milan players
U.S. Fiorenzuola 1922 S.S. players